Brichta is a surname. Notable people with the surname include:

 Adriana Esteves Agostinho Brichta (born 1969), Brazilian actress
 Aleš Brichta (born 1959), Czech heavy metal singer, songwriter, and artist
 Vladimir Brichta (born 1976), Brazilian actor